Francesco Berardino Corradini (1635 – 26 December 1718) was a Roman Catholic prelate who was Bishop of Marsi (1680–1718).

Biography
Francesco Berardino Corradini was born in Fabriano, Italy, in 1635.
On 27 May 1680, he was appointed during the papacy of Pope Innocent XI as Bishop of Marsi.
On 2 June 1680, he was consecrated bishop by Gasparo Carpegna, Cardinal-Priest of San Silvestro in Capite, with Giacomo Altoviti, Titular Patriarch of Antioch, and Odoardo Cibo, Titular Archbishop of Seleucia in Isauria as co-consecrators. 
He served as Bishop of Marsi until his death on 26 December 1718.

References

External links and additional sources
 (for Chronology of Bishops)
 (for Chronology of Bishops)

17th-century Italian Roman Catholic bishops
18th-century Italian Roman Catholic bishops
Bishops appointed by Pope Innocent XI
1635 births
1718 deaths